Portuguesa–Tietê is a metro station on São Paulo Metro Line 1-Blue, located in the district of Santana, in São Paulo. It was opened on September 26, 1975.  Named  as Tietê, it was renamed on June 10, 2006 as a tribute to Associação Portuguesa de Desportos, soccer club located in its surroundings.

Location
The station is located west of Tietê Road Terminal, which is connected since its opening in 1982.

Characteristics
It is an elevated station with structure in apparent concrete and two side platforms. Besides the access, it also has two gates in each of the platforms, in a way that the passenger who leaves a train in the station can't take another one in the opposite way without paying another fee.

It has four exits, being one of them inside the area of the Road Terminal, one for the urban bus terminal along with the road terminal, one on the east sidewalk and another one on the west sidewalk of Avenida Cruzeiro do Sul.

References

São Paulo Metro stations
Railway stations opened in 1975